Luc or His Share of Things is a Canadian drama film, directed by Michel Audy and released in 1982. The film stars Pierre Normandin as Luc, a young man in Trois-Rivières, Quebec, who is coming to terms with being gay; the negative reactions from his family and the wider community drive him to attempt suicide, until he is saved by the compassion and support of his friends François (Éric Boulay) and Louis (Alain Thiffault).

The film was originally created as an educational film on LGBT-related issues in counselling for use in social work and psychology programs, and funded by the Quebec Ministry of Education, but was deemed dramatically strong enough to be screened at the 1982 Montreal World Film Festival. However, the film had no other known commercial distribution apart from its educational use.

A chapter analyzing Audy's work in the 2014 book Cinephemera: Archives, Ephemeral Cinema, and New Screen Histories in Canada stated that the film deserved to be rescued from obscurity and exhibited again in light of contemporary discourse around anti-LGBTQ bullying.

References

External links

1982 films
1982 drama films
1982 LGBT-related films
Canadian drama films
Canadian LGBT-related films
Films shot in Quebec
Films set in Quebec
LGBT-related drama films
1980s French-language films
1980s Canadian films
1980s educational films
Canadian educational films